Abigail is the second album by Danish heavy metal band King Diamond, and the band's first concept album. It was released on 15 June 1987 via Roadrunner Records. There were several re-releases, first in 1997 with four bonus tracks, and then a 25th anniversary edition in 2005 with a bonus DVD. Abigail is the last album to feature guitarist Michael Denner and bassist Timi Hansen.

Plot 
Abigail tells the story of a young couple, Miriam Natias and Jonathan La'Fey, who move into an old mansion that La'Fey inherited. It takes place in the summer of 1845. Upon their  arrival they are warned by seven horsemen not to move into the house because if they do, "18 will become 9." They do not heed the warning and proceed to move into the mansion. During their first night, Jonathan meets with Count de La'Fey, the Family Ghost, who is a deceased relative. The ghost shows him a casket in which a corpse of a stillborn child, Abigail, rests. The ghost informs him that Miriam is carrying the spirit of Abigail and that the child will soon be reborn. He insists that Jonathan must kill Miriam at once to prevent the rebirth.

The narration then relates the story of what happened to the Count and his wife: on 7 July 1777, the Count had discovered his wife had been unfaithful to him, and was pregnant with an illegitimate child. Enraged, he pushed the Countess down the stairs, breaking her neck and causing the child to be stillborn. The Count had the body of the Countess cremated, and the stillborn fetus he named Abigail and had mummified and laid to rest in a sarcophagus, the Count having an inexplicable urge to preserve Abigail for the future.

The narration then returns to the summer of 1845, during which Jonathan and Miriam are beset by a range of omens; the church bell rings despite nobody being inside to ring it, flowers die, unwholesome stenches fill the house and in the dining room the table is discovered set for 3. In one incident an empty cradle is discovered by Jonathan swaying in the air, with both him and Miriam insisting that they didn't bring it with them. The next day, Miriam is clearly pregnant and the fetus develops quickly; Jonathan realises that the family ghost was speaking the truth.

The fatal crisis begins when Jonathan accuses Abigail of possessing Miriam, and Abigail (through Miriam) admits it. Jonathan is terrified and considers getting a priest to exorcise Miriam – Miriam, however, exercising a moment of control, urges him to cast her down the stairs to kill her just as the Count had slain the Countess and Abigail's original incarnation. Therefore, Jonathan pretends to give in to Abigail's demands, and suggests to Abigail (once she regains control of Miriam) that she should come down to the family crypt so she can be reborn where she died. However, as the couple stands at the top of the stairs, Jonathan is distracted and the possessed Miriam pushes Jonathan down the stairs.

Miriam gives birth to Abigail, but dies shortly afterwards, her last sight being of Abigail's "yellow eyes"; supposedly her ghost can be heard screaming on the stairs in July ever after. The seven horsemen arrive at the mansion and discover the baby Abigail in the sarcophagus, eating something too horrifying for the narrator to mention (though the fact that it is found in the sarcophagus suggests that Abigail is eating her own previous body). Appalled, they take her away to bury her in a hidden chapel in the forest with seven silver spikes driven through her body (a burial heard as the intro to the album), in the hope that this will prevent a further resurrection.

Critical reception 

AllMusic's Eduardo Rivadavia wrote that Abigail is "widely recognized as King Diamond's solo masterpiece" and "is also unquestionably one of heavy metal's greatest concept albums". Canadian journalist Martin Popoff remarked the "metallic excellence" of the album, but was negatively taken aback by the "creepy package" and the lyrics.

Guitarist Andy LaRocque said it is his favourite King Diamond album as the "good atmosphere we had as a band at that time is captured in the album."

Legacy 
Capcom made a homage to this album in its 1989 video game Final Fight, naming the (male) boss of its fifth stage as Abigail. This boss also has a face very similar to King Diamond's.

There is also a tribute to Diamond's father in the liner notes, "the bravest and noblest man" he claims to have ever known.

The video for "The Family Ghost" was featured in the Beavis and Butt-head episode "Bungholio: Lord of the Harvest", where it was ridiculed by the duo.

Track listing

Remaster bonus tracks

DVD tracks (live in Sweden)

Personnel 
 King Diamond – vocals, producer
 Andy LaRocque – guitar
 Michael Denner – guitar, assistant producer
 Timi Hansen – bass guitar
 Mikkey Dee – drums, assistant producer
 Roberto Falcao – engineer, keyboards

References

External links 
 Abigail on King Diamond Coven

King Diamond albums
1987 albums
Concept albums
Roadrunner Records albums
Rock operas